Law & Order: Criminal Intent is an American police procedural television series set and filmed in New York City. It is the second spin-off of the long-running crime drama Law & Order. Law & Order: Criminal Intent follows a distinct division of the New York City Police Department: the Major Case Squad, which investigates high-profile murder cases, such as those involving VIPs, local government officials and employees, the financial industry, and the art world. Unlike the other series in the Law & Order franchise Law & Order: Criminal Intent gives significant attention to the actions and motives of the criminals, rather than primarily focusing on the police investigation and trial prosecution. Episodes do not usually contain trials, and often end in confessions rather than plea bargains or verdicts.

Law & Order: Criminal Intent premiered on NBC on September 30, 2001. Following a ratings decline, the series moved to the USA Network after the end of its sixth season. CI continued with its seventh season on USA Network on October 4, 2007 and ended at its tenth season on June 26, 2011.

During its ten-season run on the two networks, 195 original episodes were broadcast.

Series overview

Law & Order: Criminal Intent is also available in various new media formats. The first six seasons of Law & Order: Criminal Intent have been released on DVD by NBC Universal subsidiary Universal Studios Home Entertainment in Region 1 with Shout Factory releasing season seven onwards. The first five seasons are also available on DVD in regions 2 and 4. Episodes from seasons one, and five through nine have been sold at the iTunes Store and Amazon Video on Demand.

Episodes

Season 1 (2001–02)

Season 2 (2002–03)

Season 3 (2003–04) 

Samantha Buck has a recurring role as Detective Lynn Bishop from the episode "Pravda" to "Mad Hops" while Kathryn Erbe was on maternity leave (though she occasionally appeared in the episodes).
Fred Berner joins as executive producer.

Season 4 (2004–05)

Season 5 (2005–06) 

Chris Noth (Detective Mike Logan) and Annabella Sciorra (Detective Carolyn Barek) join the cast to alternate episodes with stars Vincent D'Onofrio and Kathryn Erbe, due to some health issues D'Onofrio had the previous season.
D'Onofrio, Erbe, Noth, and Sciorra work together on the two-part mid-season episode(s) "In The Wee Small Hours", with all four walking with Jamey Sheridan (Captain James Deakins) and Courtney B. Vance (A.D.A. Ron Carver) on screen during the opening credits.
 Sciorra, Sheridan, and Vance depart the cast at the end of the season; no explanation was given for Sciorra and Vance's departure.

Season 6 (2006–07) 

Julianne Nicholson (Detective Megan Wheeler) and Eric Bogosian (Captain Daniel Ross) join the cast.
Warren Leight replaces René Balcer as showrunner. Norberto Barba replaces Fred Berner as executive producer.
The final season to air original episodes on NBC.

Season 7 (2007–08) 

The show moved this season to USA Network to air original episodes.
Alicia Witt joins the cast as Detective Nola Falacci from the episode "Seeds" to "Senseless" while Julianne Nicholson was on maternity leave. Nicholson returned in the episode "Contract".

Season 8 (2009) 

Jeff Goldblum joins the cast as Detective Zack Nichols, replacing Chris Noth.
Warren Leight is replaced by Walon Green (Goren/Eames episodes) and Robert Nathan (Nichols/Wheeler episodes) as showrunner. Nathan later left and was replaced by Ed Zuckerman. Michael S. Chernuchin and John David Coles also join as executive producer. This change in showrunners caused the season to be delayed from November 7, 2008, to January and February 2009 to the premiere date of April 19, 2009 and also to have the episodes aired out of chronological order.
At the end of the season, Kathryn Erbe replaced Julianne Nicholson who had to go on maternity leave. Nicholson opted not to return the following season.

Season 9 (2010) 

 A cast shake-up occurs where D'Onofrio, Erbe, and Bogosian depart the cast after the two-part premiere episode "Loyalty", which features Goldblum, D'Onofrio, and Erbe working a special case together (a one-time-only opening credits for "Loyalty (Part 2)" featured these three actors together). Saffron Burrows (Detective Serena Stevens) joins the cast in the full-team investigation in "Loyalty (Part 2)" as a replacement for Nicholson (and replacing Erbe from episode 3 onwards). Mary Elizabeth Mastrantonio joins the cast as Captain Zoe Callas.
 Walon Green becomes the showrunner for all episodes.
 At the end of the season, Goldblum, Burrows, and Mastrantonio depart the cast.

Season 10 (2011) 

 This final season sees a return to the single, original pairing of the first four seasons, as Vincent D'Onofrio and Kathryn Erbe rejoin the cast as Detective Robert Goren and Detective Alex Eames.
 Jeff Goldblum (Detective Zack Nichols), Saffron Burrows (Detective Serena Stevens) and Mary Elizabeth Mastrantonio (Captain Zoe Callas) did not return for this final season.
Jay O. Sanders (Captain Joseph Hannah) and Julia Ormond (Dr. Paula Gyson) join the cast, credited with "star" billing alongside D'Onofrio and Erbe.
 This is the shortest season of the entire series with only 8 episodes.
Chris Brancato takes over as showrunner and executive producer, replacing Walon Green.

Home video releases

See also 
 List of Law & Order: Criminal Intent characters

Notes

External links 
 Law & Order: Criminal Intent at USA Network
 Law & Order: Criminal Intent at NBC
 

Lists of American crime drama television series episodes